Scott Douglas Bullett (born December 25, 1968) is a former professional baseball outfielder. He played all or part of four seasons between 1991 and 1996. He also played one season in Japan with the Chunichi Dragons in 2002. Towards the end of his career, he played in the Mexican Professional Summer League. Bullett now runs Bullettproof Baseball Academy, an elite youth baseball program in Welland, Ontario.

References

External links

 Scott Bullett at SABR (Baseball BioProject)

1968 births
African-American baseball players
Allentown Ambassadors players
American expatriate baseball players in Japan
American expatriate baseball players in Mexico
American expatriate baseball players in Taiwan
Augusta Pirates players
Baseball players from West Virginia
Broncos de Reynosa players
Buffalo Bisons (minor league) players
Carolina Mudcats players
Chicago Cubs players
Chunichi Dragons players
Colorado Springs Sky Sox players
Gulf Coast Pirates players
Iowa Cubs players
Leones de Yucatán players
Living people
Major League Baseball outfielders
Mexican League baseball first basemen
Mexican League baseball outfielders
Nippon Professional Baseball outfielders
Olmecas de Tabasco players
Sportspeople from Martinsburg, West Virginia
Piratas de Campeche players
Pittsburgh Pirates players
Rochester Red Wings players
Salem Buccaneers players
Sultanes de Monterrey players
Uni-President Lions players
Welland Pirates players
21st-century African-American people
20th-century African-American sportspeople